Lorenzo José Carranco (1695, in Cholula, New Spain – October 2, 1734 in Misión de Santiago de los Coras Aiñiní, New Spain) was a Jesuit missionary.

Biography
Born in Cholulua in 1695, Carranco studied at Puebla and made his novitiate in Tepotzotlán. In 1725, he trained at Nuestra Senora del Pilar de la Paz Airapi in La Paz to take over at Misión de Santiago de los Coras Aiñiní. Briefly, he served as a missionary at Todos los Santos, Baja California Sur. In 1727, Carranco succeeded Father Ignacio Maria Napoli at Misión de Santiago. He was killed in the Rebelión de los pericúes at the Misión de Santiago by the Pericúes in a manner similar to Nicolás Tamaral.

References

1695 births
1734 deaths
People from Puebla
People of the Californias
Jesuit missionaries
Mexican Jesuits
Catholic martyrs
Spanish Roman Catholic missionaries
Roman Catholic missionaries in New Spain
People murdered in New Spain
Spanish murder victims
Jesuit martyrs